Viola Township is located in Lee County, Illinois. As of the 2010 census, its population was 351 and it contained 132 housing units. Viola Township was originally named Stockton Township and was formed from Brooklyn Township on February 12, 1861. The name was changed to Viola Township in September, 1861.

Geography

Demographics

References

External links
US Census
City-data.com
Cook County Official Site
Illinois State Archives

Townships in Lee County, Illinois
1861 establishments in Illinois
Townships in Illinois